Elysian Encounter  is Baker Gurvitz Army's second studio album.

Track listing
All tracks composed by Adrian Gurvitz; except where noted.
"People" (Ginger Baker, Adrian Gurvitz) – 4:17 
"The Key" (Ginger Baker, Paul Gurvitz) – 6:24 
"Time" – 4:04 
"The Gambler" – 4:23 
"The Dreamer" – 3:41 
"Remember" (Ginger Baker, Adrian Gurvitz) – 5:24 
"The Artist" – 5:12 
"The Hustler" (Ginger Baker, Adrian Gurvitz, Paul Gurvitz) – 6:41

Personnel
Baker Gurvitz Army
 Mr. Snips - lead vocals (1, 2, 4, 5, 7, 8)
 Adrian Gurvitz - guitar, backing and lead (3, 6) vocals
 Peter Lemer - keyboards
 Paul Gurvitz - bass, backing vocals
 Ginger Baker - drums, backing vocals, percussion

Mixed at Trident Studios and Island Studios

References

1975 albums
Baker Gurvitz Army albums
Albums produced by Eddy Offord
Vertigo Records albums

cs:Baker Gurvitz Army (album)